Arto Sakari Ruotanen (born April 11, 1961) is a retired professional ice hockey defenceman who played in the SM-liiga.  He played for Kärpät.  He was inducted into the Finnish Hockey Hall of Fame in 2003. He is 5'11" (181 cm) tall and nicknamed 'Artsi'.

Career statistics

Regular season and playoffs

International

References

External links
 Finnish Hockey Hall of Fame bio 
 

1961 births
Berlin Capitals players
Finnish ice hockey defencemen
HV71 players
Ice hockey players at the 1984 Winter Olympics
Ice hockey players at the 1988 Winter Olympics
Ice hockey players at the 1992 Winter Olympics
Living people
Olympic ice hockey players of Finland
Olympic medalists in ice hockey
Olympic silver medalists for Finland
Oulun Kärpät players
People from Pyhäjärvi
Rögle BK players
IF Troja/Ljungby players
Sportspeople from North Ostrobothnia